Almafuerte is the third studio album by heavy metal band Almafuerte released in 1998. The album contains several covers of Ricardo Iorio former band Hermética.

Track listing
All lyrics by Ricardo Iorio. Music by Claudio Marciello.
 Mano Brava- [Brave Hand]
 Almafuerte
 Triunfo - [Triumph]
 Sé vos - [Be Yourself]
 Niño jefe - [Boss Kid]
 Memoria de siglos - [Memory of Centuries]
 Ser humano junto a los míos - [Be Human With Mines]
 Desde el oeste - [From The West]
 Del más allá - [From Beyond]
 Tu eres su seguridad - [You're His Security]
 Ceibo

Personnel
Ricardo Iorio - Vocals/Bass
Claudio Marciello - Guitars
Walter Martinez - Drums

1998 albums
PolyGram albums
Almafuerte (band) albums
Spanish-language albums